The 1989 International cricket season was from May 1989 to September 1989. The only international series iduring this season was Australia tour of England for The Ashes Test series and 3-ODI Texaco Trophy.

Season overview

May

Australia in England

References

1989 in cricket